William de Pembroke was Archdeacon of Totnes in England during 1263.

References

Archdeacons of Totnes